Tooma is a locality and village community in the Snowy Valleys Council local government area, in the eastern part of the Riverina region of New South Wales.

Location 
Tooma is in the valley of the Tooma River, not far from its confluence with the Murray River. The village is adjacent to Tumbarumba Creek, a tributary of the Tooma River.

History 
Tooma Post Office opened on 1 January 1873. A school opened in Tooma in February 1876 and closed in August 1980.

The Tooma District was one of ten locations that were shortlisted for the site of Australia's national capital in 1900. It was one of the last to be eliminated. In the final series of parliamentary ballots in October 1908, Tooma was one of the eleven sites in contention, and it survived until the eighth of the nine ballots, after which only Dalgety and the eventual capital site 'Yass Canberra' remained in contention. The site for the city was identified as being at nearby Welaregang.

Climate

Climate data for Tooma are sourced at nearby Khancoban of approximately the same altitude. Summers are hot and dry, winters cool and rainy with occasional snowfalls.

Gallery

See also
 Snowy Mountains Scheme
 Tooma River
 Tooma Dam

References

External links

Towns in the Riverina
Towns in New South Wales
Snowy Valleys Council
Proposed sites for national capital of Australia